The Caudron C.680 was a 2-seat sport aircraft built by Caudron in the late 1930s.

Design
The C.680 was a low-wing monoplane of all-wood construction, with the airframe covered by canvas and plywood.

Specifications

References

Further reading

C.680
Single-engined tractor aircraft
Low-wing aircraft
Aircraft first flown in 1936